Anne B. "Annie B." Crockett-Stark (born December 12, 1942) is an American politician. From 2006 to 2014, she was a Republican member of the Virginia House of Delegates representing the 6th District in the southwestern part of the state.

Crockett-Stark announced that she would not run for reelection in 2013.

Biography
Anne B. Crockett was born in Wytheville, Virginia. She received a B.S. in English from Radford University in 1969, and an M.S. in community college guidance in 1979. She also did some graduate work at Virginia Tech. She worked as an educator and guidance counselor.

She married Dr. Carl E. Stark. They had two daughters, Anne C. Carney and Susan C. Aker.

Early political career
Crockett-Stark started her political career in 1978, when she became the first woman elected to the Wytheville Town Council.  She served on the council until 1982. She also served on the Wythe County Board of Supervisors from 1988 through 2005, and was its chair in 2003.

House of Delegates

Electoral history
Crockett-Stark's first race for House of Delegates in 2005 was notable in that it was the only incumbent Democratic loss in the House during the 2005 election cycle. She defeated Benny Keister, a three-term member.

The 2011 election was the first in which she had no opponent.

Scandals involving campaign staff
During both her 2005 and 2007 campaigns, Delegate Crockett-Stark received negative press coverage for comments made by her campaign staff. In 2005, a staffer made derogatory remarks on her personal blog about "trolling for votes among 'rednecks' who resembled Bigfoot and freak show tattooed men who lived in places that looked like horror movie sets." In 2007, a local campaign staffer posted a quote on her online Facebook profile insinuating that Delegate Crockett-Stark referred to her donors using a derogatory name. Both staffers were immediately terminated.

Legislative record

2006 legislative session
During the 2006 legislative session, Delegate Crockett-Stark proposed ten bills, two studies, and five commending resolutions. Both studies were killed, along with seven of her bills. This left Delegate Crockett-Stark with a passage rate for legislation of 25%, 47% if her commending resolutions are included.

2007 legislative session
During the 2007 legislative session, Delegate Crockett-Stark proposed twelve bills and four commending resolutions. The 2007 legislative session was notable in that all twelve house bills proposed by Delegate Crockett-Stark were killed, giving her a 0% passage rate for legislation during the 2007 session, 25% if her commending resolutions are included.

Interest group ratings
Interest group ratings for Crockett-Stark, as compiled by Project Vote Smart:

Businesses
Virginia Chamber of Commerce - 51% (2005)
Virginia FREE - 57% (2007)
Education
Virginia Education Association - 63% (2006) 
Environment
Virginia League of Conservation Voters - 38% (2006) 
Virginia League of Conservation Voters - 60% (2007) 
Labor
Virginia AFL-CIO - 25% (2006) 
Virginia AFL-CIO - 20% (2007)

References

External links
Virginia House of Delegates: Bio for Anne B. Crockett-Stark (2008 session)  
Virginia Public Access Project: Anne B. Crockett-Stark

Vote Smart Interest Group Ratings

1942 births
Living people
Republican Party members of the Virginia House of Delegates
Radford University alumni
Virginia Tech alumni
People from Wytheville, Virginia
Women state legislators in Virginia
21st-century American politicians
21st-century American women politicians